How Many Times Can We Say Goodbye is a studio album by the American singer Dionne Warwick. It was released by Arista Records on September 29, 1983, in the United States. Recorded during the spring of 1983, Warwick worked with the singer and songwriter Luther Vandross, who also appears on the hit title track. The album includes the original version of the song "So Amazing", which Vandross would record later for his Give Me the Reason album, and a remake of The Shirelles' 1960 hit "Will You Still Love Me Tomorrow", featuring the original group on guest vocals.

Despite strong reviews, How Many Times Can We Say Goodbye failed to reprise the commercial success of its predecessor Heartbreaker (1982) and became a commercial disappointment, stalling at number 57 on the US Billboard 200. Lead single "How Many Times Can We Say Goodbye" hit number 4 on the Adult Contemporary chart and number 27 on the Billboard Hot 100, while the upbeat "Got a Date" peaked at number 45 on the Hot R&B/Hip-Hop Songs chart.

Track listing
All tracks produced by Luther Vandross.

Personnel and credits 
Musicians

 Dionne Warwick – lead vocals, backing vocals (2, 6)
 Nat Adderley Jr. – keyboards, rhythm arrangements (2, 4, 5, 6, 8), synthesizer arrangements (4-7), horn and string arrangements (6)
 Cliff Branch – clavinet (1)
 Marcus Miller – synthesizers (1, 3), bass guitar (1-5, 8), rhythm arrangements (1), synthesizer arrangements (1)
 Skip Anderson – synthesizers (2, 4, 5, 7)
 Doc Powell – guitar (1-5, 8)
 Georg Wadenius – guitar (1-5, 8)
 Peter Frampton – guitar solo (1, 3)
 Paul Jackson Jr. – guitar (6)
 Abraham Laboriel – bass guitar (6)
 Yogi Horton – drums (1-5, 7, 8)
 Carlos Vega – drums (6)
 Sammy Figueroa – congas (1, 3)
 Paulinho da Costa – percussion (1, 3, 4, 5, 7, 8)
 Paul Riser – horn and string arrangements (2, 7)
 Jimmy Webb – horn and string arrangements (4, 8)
 Leon Pendarvis – horn and string arrangements (5)
 Tawatha Agee – backing vocals (1, 3)
 Patti Austin – backing vocals (1, 4)
 Phillip Ballou – backing vocals (1, 4)
 Cissy Houston – backing vocals (1, 4)
 Yvonne Lewis – backing vocals (1, 2, 4)
 Fonzi Thornton – backing vocals (1)
 Luther Vandross – backing vocals (1, 2, 4), vocal arrangements (1, 2, 3), rhythm arrangements (2), lead vocals (4)
 Brenda White – backing vocals (1, 3, 4)
 Damaris Carbaugh – backing vocals (2)
 Lani Groves – backing vocals (2)
 Louise Bethune – backing vocals (3)
 Michelle Cobbs – backing vocals (3, 4)
 Diana Graselli – backing vocals (3)
 Alfa Anderson – backing vocals (4)
 The Shirelles – backing vocals (8)

Production

 Producer – Luther Vandross
 Engineers – Ray Bardani, Carl Beatty, Michael Brauer, Michael Christopher, Doug Epstein and Bill Stein.
 Assistant Engineers – Michael Christopher, Mark Cobrin, Scott Maguchi, Jim Scott and Harry Spiridakis.
 Recorded at Record Plant (Los Angeles, CA). and Mediasound (New York, NY).
 Mixing – Ray Bardani, Marcus Miller and Luther Vandross.
 Mastered by Greg Calbi at Sterling Sound (New York, NY).
 Art Direction and Design – Donn Davenport 
 Photography – Frank Laffitte
 Management – GMI

Charts

References

External links
How Many Times Can We Say Goodbye at Discogs

Dionne Warwick albums
1983 albums
Arista Records albums
albums arranged by Paul Riser
Albums produced by Luther Vandross